Sascha Fischer (born 24 December 1971, in Stuttgart) is retired a German international rugby union player, having last played for Le Bugue athletic club in the Federale 1 and also the German national rugby union team.

He played his last game for Germany against Belgium on 10 November 2007.

He played professionally for CS Bourgoin-Jallieu in France, a club he played Heineken Cup and European Challenge Cup matches for.

Honours

National team
 European Nations Cup - Division 2
 Champions: 2008

Stats
Sascha Fischer's personal statistics in club and international rugby:

Club

 As of 15 December 2010

National team

European Nations Cup

Friendlies & other competitions

 As of 15 December 2010

References

External links
 Sascha Fischer at scrum.com
   Sascha Fischer at totalrugby.de

1971 births
Living people
German rugby union players
Germany international rugby union players
DSV 78 Hannover players
CS Bourgoin-Jallieu players
Expatriate rugby union players in France
Rugby union locks
Sportspeople from Stuttgart
German expatriate rugby union players
German expatriate sportspeople in France